The 2005 WPA World Nine-ball Championship was the 16th edition of the WPA World Championship for 9-Ball Pool. It took place from July 2 to 10, 2005 in the Taiwanese city, Kaohsiung.

Taiwanese Wu Chia-ching won the championship with a 17–16 victory in the final against compatriot Kuo Po-Cheng. Defending champion Alex Pagulayan was eliminated by Vilmos Földes in the round of 32.

Format
The 128 participating players were divided into 16 groups, in which they competed in round robin mode against each other. The top four players in each group qualified for the final round played in the knockout system, featuring the remaining 64 players.

Group stage
The following players exited the competition in the group stage:

Final round

References

See also
 List of sporting events in Taiwan
 List of WPA World Nine-ball champions

External links
Live scoring at WPA-pool.com
 Empire Poker WPA World Pool Championship 2005  at azbilliards.com

2004
WPA World Nine-ball Championship
WPA World Nine-ball Championship
International sports competitions hosted by Taiwan